The Mankato Union Depot in Mankato, Minnesota, United States, is a historic railway station.  It was added to the National Register of Historic Places in 1980.  The depot was built in 1896 by the Chicago and Northwestern Railway and the Chicago, St. Paul, Minneapolis and Omaha Railway.  Passenger service ended in the 1960s and today the depot houses a business.

References

Railway stations on the National Register of Historic Places in Minnesota
Railway stations in the United States opened in 1896
Former railway stations in Minnesota
National Register of Historic Places in Blue Earth County, Minnesota
1896 establishments in Minnesota
Transportation in Blue Earth County, Minnesota
Former Chicago and North Western Railway stations